Jean Laudet (born 5 August 1930) is a French sprint canoeist who competed in the early 1950s. He won a gold medal in the C-2 10000 m event at the 1952 Summer Olympics in Helsinki.

References

1930 births
Living people
Canoeists at the 1952 Summer Olympics
French male canoeists
Olympic canoeists of France
Olympic gold medalists for France
Olympic medalists in canoeing
Medalists at the 1952 Summer Olympics
20th-century French people